The FINA Water Polo World League was an international water polo league organized by FINA, which plays annually, typically from winter through to June. League play featured continental tournaments for men and women, from which the top teams emerged to play in the championship tournament (the "Super Final") where the league champion team is crowned.

Men's league play began in 2002, to capitalize on increased worldwide popularity of water polo created by the 2000 Olympic Games, especially in Europe, North America and Australia. The women’s league was added in 2004, based on growing interest in women's play.

In October 2022, FINA announced that the tournament would be replaced with the FINA Water Polo World Cup and FINA Women's Water Polo World Cup from 2023 on.

Play format
Matches consisted of four eight-minute quarters, with a five-minute half-time break. Tie games were decided by an immediate penalty shootout. The game venues had television requirements to bring the sport to the biggest audience possible. Rule changes were made to provide more spectacular play and yield higher scores.

Preliminary rounds of play were organized by continent: Americas, Asia-Pacific, and Europe. The structure of continental play varied within the league. For example, for 2012, the Americas had a single tournament for each sex, Asia/Oceania has two tournaments for each sex on consecutive weekends, and Europe has six weekends of play for men and two for women.

Men

Summary

Medal table

Participation details
Legend

  – Champions
  – Runners-up
  – Third place
  – Fourth place
  – Quarterfinals
  — Did not enter qualifications
  — Did not qualify for the final tournament
  — Qualified but withdrew
  – Hosts
 † – Defunct team

Women

Winners

Medal standings

Participation details
Legend

  – Champions
  – Runners-up
  – Third place
  – Fourth place
  – Quarterfinals
  — Did not enter qualifications
  — Did not qualify for the final tournament
  — Qualified but withdrew
  – Hosts

See also
 List of water polo world medalists
 Major achievements in water polo by nation

References

External links
FINA water polo official site
Water Polo page of FINA's old website (2010 and earlier).

 
Women's water polo competitions
W
Sports leagues disestablished in 2022